The Pattern of Marriage is a series of one hour British television documentaries which aired in 1953 on the BBC. It consisted of four episodes and was written by Ted Willis and Caryl Doncaster, the latter also serving as producer. The Church of England, the National Marriage Guidance Council, the Catholic Marriage Advisory Council and the Magistrates' Association were involved in the research for the series.

The four episodes were entitled A Home of Their Own, broadcast 11 March 1953, Two's Company, broadcast 8 April 1953,A Son, broadcast 27 April 1953 and For Better or for Worse, broadcast 22 May 1953.

References

External links
The Pattern of Marriage on IMDb

1950s British documentary television series
1953 British television series debuts
1953 British television series endings
BBC Television shows
Black-and-white British television shows
British documentary television series